Adobe InDesign is a desktop publishing and page layout designing software application produced by Adobe Inc. and first released in 1999. It can be used to create works such as posters, flyers, brochures, magazines, newspapers, presentations, books and ebooks. InDesign can also publish content suitable for tablet devices in conjunction with Adobe Digital Publishing Suite. Graphic designers and production artists are the principal users.

InDesign is the successor to Adobe PageMaker, which Adobe acquired by buying Aldus Corporation in late 1994. (Freehand, Aldus's competitor to Adobe Illustrator, was licensed from Altsys, the maker of Fontographer.) By 1998 PageMaker had lost much of professional market to the comparatively feature-rich QuarkXPress version 3.3, released in 1992, and version 4.0, released in 1996. In 1999, Quark announced its offer to buy Adobe and to divest the combined company of PageMaker to avoid problems under United States antitrust law. Adobe rebuffed Quark's offer and continued to develop a new desktop publishing application. Aldus had begun developing a successor to PageMaker, which was code-named "Shuksan". Later, Adobe code-named the project "K2", and Adobe released InDesign 1.0 in 1999.

Adobe launched InDesign in the United Kingdom through a series of promotional presentations in hotels. The marketing concentrated on new software architecture—a small central software kernel (about 2Mb) to which add-ons would be bolted as the program's functionality expanded in later versions. However, the Postscript printer driver for InDesign 1.0 was an external app that tended to acquire frequent corruption problems, requiring periodic reinstallation.
Copies of InDesign 1.5 were usually given away when it was found that a host of bugs had to be corrected. By InDesign 2.0, the temperamental printer driver was embedded in the main software. The 'kernel' architecture was never mentioned again.

InDesign was the first native Mac OS X windows
(available on almost all devices) publishing (DTP) software. With the third major version, InDesign CS, Adobe increased InDesign's distribution by bundling it with Adobe Photoshop, Adobe Illustrator, and Adobe Acrobat in Adobe Creative Suite.

InDesign exports documents in Adobe's Portable Document Format (PDF) and supports multiple languages. It was the first DTP application to support Unicode character sets, advanced typography with OpenType fonts, advanced transparency features, layout styles, optical margin alignment, and cross-platform scripting with JavaScript.

Later versions of the software introduced new file formats. To support the new features, especially typographic, introduced with InDesign CS, both the program and its document format are not backward-compatible. Instead, InDesign CS2 introduced the INX format, an XML-based document representation, to allow backwards compatibility with future versions. InDesign CS versions updated with the 3.1 April 2005 update can read InDesign CS2-saved files exported to the  format. The InDesign Interchange format does not support versions earlier than InDesign CS. With InDesign CS4, Adobe replaced INX with InDesign Markup Language (IDML), another XML-based document representation.

Adobe worked on the provision of a 'Drag and Drop' feature and this became available after 2004 but was restricted to dropping graphics and images, not text. Adobe developed InDesign CS3 (and Creative Suite 3) as universal binary software compatible with native Intel and PowerPC Macs in 2007, two years after the announced 2005 schedule, inconveniencing early adopters of Intel-based Macs. Adobe CEO Bruce Chizen had announced that "Adobe will be first with a complete line of universal applications".
The CS2 Mac version had code tightly integrated to the PPC architecture, and not natively compatible with the Intel processors in Apple's new machines, so porting the products to another platform was more difficult than had been anticipated. Adobe developed the CS3 application integrating Macromedia products (2005), rather than recompiling CS2 and simultaneously developing CS3. By this time 'Drag and Drop' of type was made available.

InDesign and Leopard 
InDesign CS3 initially had a serious compatibility issue with Leopard (Mac OS X 10.5), as Adobe stated: "InDesign CS3 may unexpectedly quit when using the Place, Save, Save As or Export commands using either the OS or Adobe dialog boxes. Unfortunately, there are no workarounds for these known issues."  Apple fixed this with their OS X 10.5.4 update.

Server version 

In October 2005, Adobe released InDesign Server CS2, a modified version of InDesign (without a user interface) for Windows and Macintosh server platforms. It does not provide any editing client; rather, it is for use by developers in creating client–server solutions with the InDesign plug-in technology. In March 2007 Adobe officially announced Adobe InDesign CS3 Server as part of the Adobe InDesign family.

File format 

The MIME type is not official

 File Open formats: 
New File formats: 
File Save As formats: 
Save file format for InCopy:
  (Assignment file)
  (Content file, Exported file)
  (Package for InCopy)
  (Package for InDesign)
 File Export formats:

Versions
Newer versions can, as a rule, open files created by older versions, but the reverse is not true. Current versions can export the InDesign file as an IDML file (InDesign Markup Language), which can be opened by InDesign versions from CS4 upwards; older versions from CS4 down can export to an INX file (InDesign Interchange format).

Features 

 Creating frames and shapes 
 Aligning objects with grids and guides
 Manipulating objects 
 Organizing objects 
 Importing text 
 Formatting text 
 Spell checking 
 Importing images 
 Master pages 
 Paragraph styles

Internationalization and localization
InDesign Middle Eastern editions come with special settings for laying out Arabic or Hebrew text. They feature:
 Text settings: Special settings for laying out Arabic or Hebrew text, such as:
 Ability to use Arabic, Persian or Hindi digits;
 Use kashidas for letter spacing and full justification;
 Ligature option;
 Adjust the position of diacritics, such as vowels of the Arabic script;
 Justify text in three possible ways: Standard, Arabic, Naskh;
 Option to insert special characters, including Geresh, Gershayim, Maqaf for Hebrew and Kashida for Arabic texts;
 Apply standard, Arabic or Hebrew styles for page, paragraph and footnote numbering.
 Bi-directional text flow: The notion of right-to-left behavior applies to several objects: Story, paragraph, character and table. It allows mixing right-to-left and left-to-right words, paragraphs and stories in a document. It is possible to change the direction of neutral characters (e.g. / or ?) according to the user's keyboard language.
 Table of contents: Provides a set of table of contents titles, one for each supported language. This table is sorted according to the chosen language. InDesign CS4 Middle Eastern versions allow users to choose the language of the index title and cross-references.
 Indices: Allows creating of a simple keyword index or a somewhat more detailed index of the information in the text using embedded indexing codes. Unlike more sophisticated programs, InDesign is incapable of inserting character style information as part of an index entry (e.g., when indexing book, journal or movie titles). Indices are limited to four levels (top level and three sub-levels). Like tables of contents, indices can be sorted according to the selected language.
 Importing and exporting: Can import QuarkXPress files up to version 4.1 (1999), even using Arabic XT, Arabic Phonyx or Hebrew XPressWay fonts, retaining the layout and content. Includes 50 import/export filters, including a Microsoft Word 97-98-2000 import filter and a plain text import filter. Exports IDML files which can be read by QuarkXPress 2017.
 Reverse layout: Include a reverse layout feature to reverse the layout of a document, when converting a left-to-right document to a right-to-left one or vice versa.
 Complex script rendering: InDesign supports Unicode character encoding, with Middle East editions supporting complex text layout for Arabic and Hebrew types of complex script. The underlying Arabic and Hebrew support is present in the Western editions of InDesign CS4, CS5, CS5.5 and CS6, but the user interface is not exposed, so it is difficult to access.

User groups
InDesign has spawned 86 user groups in 36 countries with a total membership of over 51,000.

See also 
 Creative Cloud controversy
 Scribus, a free, cross-platform and non-proprietary alternative to Adobe InDesign
 Tasmeem, an Arabic enhancement

References

External links

 

1999 software
Indesign
Indesign
Desktop publishing software
Graphics software
Typesetting software
Classic Mac OS software
Desktop publishing software for macOS
Desktop publishing software for Windows